Mohammad Zeyna (also Romanized as Moḩammad Zeynā) is a village in Fedagh Rural District, Central District, Gerash County, Fars Province, Iran. At the 2016 census, its population was 1066, in 232 families.

References 

Populated places in Larestan County